Reversal of Fortune is a 1990 film adaptation of the book of the same name by Alan Dershowitz.

Reversal of Fortune may also refer to:

 Reversal of Fortune (2003 film), a South Korean film
 Reversal of Fortune (2005 film), a documentary film about a homeless man who receives $100,000 anonymously

See also
"Reversals of Fortune", an episode of Gossip Girl